The 7th Portal is an American animated web series produced by Stan Lee in 1999. It was the first global team of cyber Super Heroes produced by Stan Lee.  The main content of the series is an Internet-based adventure in which six characters from all over the world who got their super powers in cyberspace are drawn into the Web and must fight super villains.

The 7th Portal premiered on the new animation hub Shockwave, on February 29, 2000, when its global launch overwhelmed Macromedia's servers. It became the most successful web originated animated series, being picked up by Fox in mid run, for distribution on TV in South America and Europe. Twenty-two episodes were made, of which the first twenty were shown on-line before the website went bankrupt. The final two episodes were only visible on television.

Main plot 
The 7th Portal told the story of Izayus (played by Stan Lee) when he approaches a young beta tester named Peter Littlecloud. He claims to have a game that will let him and his friends fight real monsters, which he projects holographically using the CD-ROM he claims contains the game. The game's premise is that there are six other dimensions, all of which have been conquered by the evil Lord Mongorr (who was Izayus's brother). The players need to take the form of a superhero in order to stop him from opening the portal to the seventh universe, their own.

After they have chosen their form, Peter, Roberto, and Greta are sucked into the computer screen, wherein time they learn that they've been transported for real into the parallel universe of Darkmoor. Also, they have been transformed into their superhero forms. Peter is the Thunderer, Roberto is Oxblood, and Greta is Gossamer. Despite their impressive powers, the heroes find that their forms are still subject to the rules of the game such as spending Life Points to use their superpowers. They are eventually captured and brought to The Bloodzone, a gladiator-like arena consisting of floating platforms over a spiked pit.

Meanwhile, Rikio, Ozubo, and Anna are confused by their friends' disappearance. Suddenly, they are transported into cyberspace to meet Izayus. He reveals to them that the CD was actually the half of The Artifact, a mysterious device that grants unlimited power to the one who gathers the two pieces. Izayus has the red half, which symbolizes life and allows transportation between Earth and Darkmoor; while Mongorr has the blue half which symbolizes death and kills anyone who touches it without the red half. Izayus uses the Artifact's red half to transform Rikio, Ozubo, and Anna into their respective superhero forms, The Streak, Conjure Man, and Imitatia.

Thunderer, Oxblood, and Gossamer discover that they must fight the Nullifiers (as Mongorr's select group of minion's call themselves) members Bearhug and Mongorr's daughter Vendetta to the death if they want to leave the Bloodzone. When Thunderer loses all his Life Points transforming back into Peter, Izayus appears and heals Gossamer. After Izayus was impaled by the Nullifier Whipsaw, Mongorr attacked Whipsaw and healed Izayus upon his capture while the Data Raiders escape with The Artifact. The Nullifiers try to stop them when the heroes are saved by The Streak, Conjure Man and Imitatia.

The heroes take the name Data Raiders for themselves and hide in a basement. A fight breaks out among them because Peter had transferred Oxblood's Life Points to his own so that he could transform into Thunderer again. This left Oxblood at zero points and transformed him back into Roberto at the cost of his scanner which is crushed by the Nullifier Krog during battle. Roberto knocks Thunderer and leaves. Knocked out, Thunderer reverts into Peter. The others, however, notice that Peter's Life Points are increasing, and hypothesize that if they get something to eat they'll be able to increase their Life Points even faster. Roberto is captured by the Nullifiers, who used him as mind-controlled bait to capture the Data Raiders. When the Data Raiders return with the food, they are attacked by the Nullifiers and are forced to surrender. With the assembled Artifact, Mongorr sends the Data Raiders back to Earth, stripping them of their powers.

Shortly afterward, he proceeds to send an army through it to destroy several of the Earth's landmarks. However, Izayus sends some of his energy through the portal, returning the Data Raiders' powers to full strength (and even restoring Roberto's scanner), and they return through the portal. The Data Raider free Izayus and defeat the Nullifiers. Izayus then destroys Mongorr and claims the Artifact using it to repair all the damage Mongorr has caused to the multiverse for in Izayus's words, "it will be as if Mongorr never existed." As a reward, the Data Raiders get to keep their powers and return to Earth. The series ends with Izayus saying that Earth and the 7th Portal will always need heroes such as the Data Raiders.

Characters

Episodes

Season 1 (2000)

Facts 
 The 7th Portal became the first ever web animation series to succeed as a 3D ride attraction and to be developed for a $150 million movie by Paramount Pictures with producer Mark Canton.
 The first public use of the word Webisode has been attributed to the marketing and promotion of The 7th Portal. It is a portmanteau formed by the words 'web' and 'episode'.

Awards 
 In November 2000, The 7th Portal won the Best of Show Web Award for "Best Entertainment Portal".

See also 
 The Accuser
 The Backstreet Project
 The Drifter
 List of animated Internet series

References

External links 
 

2000 web series debuts
American animated web series